Eddie Jenkins  ( – after 1925) was a Welsh international footballer. He was part of the Wales national football team, playing one match on 28 February 1925 against England. He was the younger brother of Wales rugby union international Billy Jenkins.

See also
 List of Wales international footballers (alphabetical)

References

1895 births
Welsh footballers
Wales international footballers
Place of birth missing
Date of death missing
Wales amateur international footballers
Association football midfielders
Lovell's Athletic F.C. players